Greater Toluca or the Metropolitan Area of Toluca is the conurbation formed by Toluca, as the core city, and 12 adjacent municipalities of the state of Mexico, namely Almoloya de Juárez, Calimaya, Chapultepec, Lerma, Metepec, Mexicaltzingo, Ocoyoacac, Otzolotepec, San Mateo Atenco, Xonacatlán and Zinacantepec. The city of Toluca is just one of several cities/towns (called localidades in Mexico) that comprise the municipality of Toluca. The municipality of Toluca, in 2020, had a population of around 910,608, whereas the population of the entire metropolitan area was 2.3 millions, making it the fifth largest metropolitan area of Mexico after Greater Mexico City, Greater Guadalajara, Greater Monterrey and Greater Puebla.

References

Metropolitan areas of Mexico